is a former Japanese football player.

Playing career
Iio was born in Nerima, Tokyo on April 10, 1980. He joined the J1 League club Verdy Kawasaki in 1999. On August 7, he debuted as defensive midfielder against Gamba Osaka. However, he did not play in any other matches. In 2000, he moved to the J2 League club Vegalta Sendai. He became a regular player as center back and the club was promoted to J1 in 2002. However, he did not play in many matches in 2002 and left the club at the end of the 2002 season. After the Regional Leagues club Okinawa Kariyushi FC (2003) and Shizuoka FC (2004), he joined the J2 club Sagan Tosu in 2005. He became a regular player and played often as center back for a long time. However, his playing time decreased in 2010. In 2011, he moved to the J2 club Yokohama FC, though he did not play much. In August 2011, he moved to the Japan Football League club Matsumoto Yamaga FC. He played often as regular center back and the club was promoted to J2 in 2012. He did not play as much in 2013 and retired at the end of the 2014 season.

Club statistics

References

External links

1980 births
Living people
Association football people from Tokyo
Japanese footballers
J1 League players
J2 League players
Japan Football League players
Tokyo Verdy players
Vegalta Sendai players
Sagan Tosu players
Yokohama FC players
Matsumoto Yamaga FC players
Association football defenders